Prigoda is a Russian surname. Notable people with the surname include:

Alexandr Prigoda (born 1964), Russian Soviet swimmer
Gennadiy Prigoda (born 1965), Russian Soviet swimmer
Sergei Prigoda (born 1957), Russian football manager and Soviet footballer

Russian-language surnames